The Best of Mr. Mister is a compilation album of the 1980s band Mr. Mister's billboard hits and some of their other well-known songs. It contains the billboard hits "Broken Wings", "Kyrie", "Hunters of the Night", "Is It Love", "Black/White" and "Something Real (Inside Me/Inside You)." It ends with the previously unreleased song entitled "Waiting in My Dreams" (which was originally intended for Pull (1990), an album that would go unreleased until 2010).

All the tracks are single edits and are remastered from the original recordings.

Track listing 
2001 US Buddha Compilation. All songs by Richard Page, Steve George and John Lang except where noted:

 "Broken Wings" – 4:44
 "Is It Love" – 3:39
 "Stand and Deliver" – 4:38
 "Hunters of the Night" (Page, George, Lang, George Ghiz) – 4:07
 "Run to Her" – 3:35
 "Something Real (Inside Me/Inside You)" – 4:20
 "Kyrie" – 4:14
 "Black/White" – 4:18
 "The Border" – 5:22
 "Talk the Talk" – 4:11
 "Healing Waters" – 4:56
 "Waiting in My Dreams" – 4:53

2002 BMG Japan Compilation.  K2 24 bit mastering.
 "Broken Wings"
 "Don't Slow Down"
 "Kyrie"
 "Something Real (Inside Me/Inside You)"
 "Waiting in My Dreams"
 "Partners in Crime"
 "Watching the World"
 "Hunters of the Night"
 "Black/White"
 "Power Over Me"
 "Is It Love"
 "Talk the Talk"
 "Run to Her"
 "Healing Waters"
 "Welcome to the Real World"
 "Control"
 "The Border"

Album credits

Personnel 
Mr. Mister
 Richard Page - bass, vocals, guitar on “Waiting in My Dreams”
 Steve George - keyboards, vocals
 Steve Farris - guitar (except on *"Waiting in My Dreams")
 Pat Mastelotto - drums

Additional personnel
 John Lang - lyrics
 Luis Conte - percussion on "Waiting in My Dreams"
 Buzz Feiten - *guitar

Notes 
 Amazon.com: The Best of Mr. Mister: Mr. Mister: Music
 Amazon.com: Best of Mr Mister: Mr. Mister: Music

Mr. Mister albums
2001 greatest hits albums
Buddah Records compilation albums